Frontenac Lake is a freshwater body of the Lac-Ashuapmushuan, Quebec unorganized territory in the northwestern part of the Regional County Municipality (RCM) Le Domaine-du-Roy in the region of Saguenay-Lac-Saint-Jean, in the province of Quebec, in Canada. This lake extends entirely in the canton of Buade.

Forestry is the main economic activity of the sector. Recreational tourism activities come second.

The forest road R0212 (East-West direction) cuts the middle of the course of the Milieu River (Normandin River). While the forest road R0223 serves the Valley of the Marquette River West, on the west side of Poutrincourt Lake. This last road connects to the Northeast at route 167 linking Chibougamau and Saint-Félicien, Quebec. The Canadian National Railway runs along this last road.

The surface of Lake Frontenac is usually frozen from early November to mid-May, however, safe ice circulation is generally from mid-November to mid-April.

Geography

Toponymy
The toponym "Lac Frontenac" was formalized on December 5, 1968, by the Commission de toponymie du Québec, at the creation of this commission.

Notes and references

See also 

Lakes of Saguenay–Lac-Saint-Jean
Le Domaine-du-Roy Regional County Municipality